Bram Vanparys, known by his stage name Bony King or The Bony King of Nowhere, is a Belgian singer-songwriter.

Biography
Vanparys made his debut under the nickname The Bony King of Nowhere. He featured twice at Pukkelpop, and once at Folk Dranouter. He wrote the title track for the film 22 mei by Koen Mortier and the film music for The Giants by Bouli Lanners. In 2015 he simplified his nickname to Bony King. That year he also brought out the album Wild Flowers.

Discography

Albums

Singles

References

External links

Living people
Musicians from Ghent
Belgian male singers
Year of birth missing (living people)